Aita (haita, rita or ghita) means in Arabic, "call, cry or lament" and is a Bedouin musical style that originates from the countryside of Morocco.

Origins 
It is sung in colloquial Arabic by mixed groups composed of musicians and singers and singers and dancers, these women are called sheikhates. In Morocco, the Aita Festival is organized in Safi.

Notable Aita singers
 Fatna Bent Lhoucine
 Hajib
 Mohamed Benomar Ziani
 Mohamed Laaroussi

References 

Moroccan styles of music